Ocean boarding vessels (OBVs) were merchant ships taken over by the Royal Navy during the Second World War for the purpose of enforcing wartime blockades by intercepting and boarding foreign vessels.

Ships

See also
Armed boarding steamer – British vessels of similar purpose in First World War
Hired armed vessels – British vessels that performed convoy escort duties, anti-privateer patrols, and ran errands during the French Revolutionary Wars and the Napoleonic Wars, and earlier.

Notes

References
Cocker, M Aircraft-carrying ships of the Royal Navy, The History Press 2008 

Ship types
Ships of the Royal Navy